The date of birth of Jesus is not stated in the gospels or in any historical sources, but most biblical scholars generally accept a date of birth between 6 BC and 4 BC, the year in which King Herod died. The historical evidence is too incomplete to allow a definitive dating, but the year is estimated through three different approaches:

 analysing references to known historical events mentioned in the nativity accounts in the Gospels of Luke and Matthew,
 working backward from the estimation of the start of the ministry of Jesus, and
 astrological or astronomical alignments.

The common Christian traditional dating of the birthdate of Jesus was 25 December, a date first asserted officially by Pope Julius I in 350 AD, although this claim is dubious or otherwise unfounded. The day or season has been estimated by various methods, including the description of shepherds watching over their sheep.

Year of birth

Nativity accounts
The nativity accounts in the New Testament gospels of Matthew and Luke do not mention a date or time of year for the birth of Jesus. Karl Rahner states that the authors of the gospels generally focused on theological elements rather than historical chronologies.

Both Luke and Matthew associate Jesus' birth with the time of Herod the Great. Matthew 2:1 states that "Jesus was born in Bethlehem of Judaea in the days of Herod the king". He also implies that Jesus could have been as much as two years old at the time of the visit of the Magi, because Herod ordered the murder of all boys up to the age of two years (Massacre of the Innocents), "in accordance with the time he had learned from the Magi". Matthew 2:16 In addition, if the phrase "about 30" in Luke 3:23 is interpreted to mean 32 years old, this could fit a date of birth just within the reign of Herod, who died in 4 BC.

Luke 1:5 mentions the reign of Herod shortly before the birth of Jesus, and places the birth during the Census of Quirinius, which the Jewish historian Josephus described as taking place circa AD 6 in his book Antiquities of the Jews (written c. AD 93), by indicating that Cyrenius/Quirinius' governorship of Syria began in AD 6 and a census took place during his tenure sometime between AD 6–7. Since Herod died many years before this census, most scholars discount the census and generally accept a date of birth between 6 and 4 BC, the year in which Herod died. Tertullian believed, some two centuries later, that a number of censuses were performed throughout the Roman world under Sentius Saturninus at the same time. Some biblical scholars and commentators believe the two accounts can be harmonized, arguing that the text in Luke can be read as "registration before Quirinius was governor of Syria", i.e., that Luke was actually referring to a completely different census. However these arguments are rejected by mainstream scholarship.

Other gospel evidence

Another approach to estimating the year of birth is based on an attempt to work backwards from the point when Jesus began preaching, using the statement in Luke 3:23 that he was "about 30 years of age" at that time. Jesus began to preach after being baptized by John the Baptist, and based on Luke's gospel John only began baptizing people in "the fifteenth year of the reign of Tiberius Caesar" (Luke 3:1–2), which scholars estimate would place the year at about AD 28–29. By working backwards from this, it would appear that Jesus was probably born no later than 1 BC. Another theory is that Herod's death was as late as after the January eclipse of 1 BC or even AD 1 after the eclipse that occurred in 1 December BC.

This date is independently confirmed by John's reference in John 2:20 to the Temple being in its 46th year of construction when Jesus began his ministry during Passover, which corresponds to around 27–29 AD according to scholarly estimates.

Theories based on the Star of Bethlehem
Most scholars regard the Star of Bethlehem account to be a pious fiction, of literary and theological value, rather than historical.  Nonetheless, attempts have been made to interpret it as an astronomical event, which might then help date Jesus' birth through the use of ancient astronomical records, or modern astronomical calculations.  The first such attempt was made by Johannes Kepler who interpreted the account to describe a Great Conjunction of the planets Jupiter and Saturn.

University of Cambridge Professor Colin Humphreys has argued in the Quarterly Journal of the Royal Astronomical Society that a comet in the early 5 BC was likely the "Star of Bethlehem", putting Jesus' birth in or near April, 5 BC. 

Other astronomical events have been considered, including a close planetary conjunction between Venus and Jupiter in 2 BC.

According to Dionysius Exiguus: the Anno Domini system

The Anno Domini dating system was devised in 525 by Dionysius Exiguus to enumerate the years in his 
Easter table. His system was to replace the Diocletian era that had been used in older Easter tables, as he did not wish to continue the memory of a tyrant who persecuted Christians. The last year of the old table, Diocletian Anno Martyrium 247, was immediately followed by the first year of his table, Anno Domini 532. When Dionysius devised his table, Julian calendar years were identified by naming the consuls who held office that year— Dionysius himself stated that the "present year" was "the consulship of Probus Junior", which was 525 years "since the incarnation of our Lord Jesus Christ". Thus, Dionysius implied that Jesus' incarnation occurred 525 years earlier, without stating the specific year during which his birth or conception occurred. "However, nowhere in his exposition of his table does Dionysius relate his epoch to any other dating system, whether consulate, Olympiad, year of the world, or regnal year of Augustus; much less does he explain or justify the underlying date."

Bonnie J. Blackburn and Leofranc Holford-Strevens briefly present arguments for 2 BC, 1 BC, or AD 1 as the year Dionysius intended for the Nativity or incarnation. Among the sources of confusion are:
 In modern times, incarnation is synonymous with the conception, but some ancient writers, such as Bede, considered incarnation to be synonymous with the Nativity.
 The civil or consular year began on 1 January, but the Diocletian year began on 29 August (30 August in the year before a Julian leap year).
 There were inaccuracies in the lists of consuls.
 There were confused summations of emperors' regnal years.

It is not known how Dionysius established the year of Jesus's birth. Two major theories are that Dionysius based his calculation on the Gospel of Luke, which states that Jesus was "about thirty years old" shortly after "the fifteenth year of the reign of Tiberius Caesar", and hence subtracted thirty years from that date, or that Dionysius counted back 532 years from the first year of his new table.
It has also been speculated by Georges Declercq that Dionysius' desire to replace Diocletian years with a calendar based on the incarnation of Christ was intended to prevent people from believing the imminent end of the world. At the time, it was believed by some that the resurrection of the dead and end of the world would occur 500 years after the birth of Jesus. The old Anno Mundi calendar theoretically commenced with the creation of the world based on information in the Old Testament. It was believed that, based on the Anno Mundi calendar, Jesus was born in the year 5500 (5500 years after the world was created) with the year 6000 of the Anno Mundi calendar marking the end of the world. Anno Mundi 6000 (approximately AD 500) was thus equated with the end of the world but this date had already passed in the time of Dionysius.
The "Historia Brittonum" attributed to Nennius written in the 9th century makes extensive use of the Anno Passionis (AP) dating system which was in common use as well as the newer AD dating system. The AP dating system took its start from 'The Year of The Passion'. It is generally accepted by experts there is a 27-year difference between AP and AD reference.

According to Jewish sources
Yeshu in Jewish scholarly sources is speculated by researchers as a reference to Jesus as in Hebrew the word "Yeshu" is used to refer Jesus and also there are similarities between Talmud Yeshu and Christian Jesus. However this fact is disputed, as Yeshu also can mean "may his name and memory be blotted out", probably used as a Damnatio memoriae to censor certain names. Talmud claims that Yeshu lived around the reign of Alexander Jannaeus who lived from 100 BC to 76 BC and since Sanhedrin 107b and Sotah 47a depicts Yeshu taking refuge in Egypt during 88-76 BC persecution of Pharisees, it can be assumed the Talmudic Yeshu was born before 88 BC and after 100 BC. Chagigah 2:2 also depicts Yeshu in same position however claims that Yeshu became an apostate during the refuge in Egypt.

This Talmudic Jewish claim that Yeshu was born before 88 BC and after 100 BC during life of Alexander Jannaeus of Hasmonean dynasty (conflicting with the account that he lived during era of Pontius Pilate, which is sourced from traditional Christian, Josephus and Tacitus) is also repeated in Jewish 11th century medieval tract Toledot Yeshu which implies that this belief was alive among at least a number of Jews during these times. Baring-Gould (page 71) notes that, although the Wagenseil version named the Queen as Helene, she is also expressly described as the widow of Alexander Jannaeus, who died BC 76, and whose widow was named Salome Alexandra and she died in BC 67.  Yeshu in Toledot Yeshu is Jesus himself and there is no possibility that he is another person named Yeshu because the tract is formed as a response to the claims of gospels. It was widely circulated in Europe and the Middle East in the medieval period as a Jewish response to Christian account. Yemenite edition of this tract, which is named "Episode of Jesus", repeats the same claim about the date when Yeshu lived.

Day and season
Despite the modern celebration of Christmas in December, neither the Gospel of Luke nor Gospel of Matthew mention a season for Jesus' birth. Scholarly arguments have been made regarding whether shepherds would have been grazing their flock during the winter, with some scholars challenging a winter birth for Jesus and some defending the idea by citing the mildness of winters in Judea and rabbinic rules regarding sheep near Bethlehem before February.

Alexander Murray of History Today argues that the celebration of Christmas as the birth day of Jesus is based on a date of a pagan feast rather than historical analysis. Saturnalia, the Roman feast for Saturn, was associated with the winter solstice. But Saturnalia was held on 17 December of the Julian calendar and later expanded with festivities only up through 23 December. The holiday was celebrated with a sacrifice at the Temple of Saturn and in the Roman Forum, as well as a public banquet, followed by private gift-giving, continual partying, and a carnival atmosphere that overturned Roman social norms. The Roman festival of Natalis Solis Invicti has also been suggested, since it was celebrated on 25 December and was associated with some prominent emperors. It is likely that such a Christian feast was chosen for Christ's marked contrast and triumph over paganism; indeed, new converts who attempted to introduce pagan elements into the Christian celebrations were sharply rebuked.

Alternatively, 25 December may have been selected owing to its proximity to the winter solstice because of its symbolic theological significance. After the solstice, the days begin to lengthen with longer hours of sunlight, which Christians see as representing the Light of Christ entering the world. This symbolism applies equally to the celebration of the Nativity of Saint John the Baptist on 24 June, near the summer solstice, based on John's remark about Jesus "He must increase; I must decrease." .

In the 1st and 2nd centuries, the Lord's Day (Sunday) was the earliest Christian celebration and included a number of theological themes. In the 2nd century, the Resurrection of Jesus became a separate feast (now called Easter) and in the same century Epiphany began to be celebrated in the Eastern Churches on 6 January. The festival of the Nativity which later turned into Christmas was a 4th-century feast in the Western Church notably in Rome and North Africa, although it is uncertain exactly where and when it was first celebrated.

The earliest source stating 25 December as the date of birth of Jesus is likely a book by Hippolytus of Rome, written in the early 3rd century. He based his view on the assumption that the conception of Jesus took place at the Spring equinox which Hippolytus placed on 25 March, and then added nine months to calculate the date of birth. That date was then used for the Christmas celebration. 25 March would also roughly be the date of his crucifixion, which ancient Christians would have seen as confirming the date of his birth, since many people of that era held the belief that the great prophets were conceived into the afterlife on the same date they were conceived into the world. Ignacio L. Götz suggests that Jesus could have been born "in the late spring of the year because pregnancies began in the fall after the harvests were in and there was enough money for a wedding feast." John Chrysostom argued for a 25 December date in the late 4th century, basing his argument on the assumption that the offering of incense mentioned in  refers to the offering of incense by a high priest on Yom Kippur (early October), and, as above, counting fifteen months forward. However, this was very likely a retrospective justification of a choice already made rather than a genuine attempt to derive the correct birth date. John Chrysostom also writes in his homily on the Nativity of our Lord Jesus Christ (Εἰς τὸ γενέθλιον τοῦ Σωτῆρος ἡµῶν Ἰησοῦ Χριστοῦ) that the date of 25 December was well known from the beginning among Westerners.

Other sources stating 25 December as the date of Jesus are:
 Evodius in an epistle reported in part by Nikephoros Kallistos Xanthopoulos in his Ecclesiastical History II, 3
 Saint Jerome described a commentary by Victorinus of Pettau on papers by Alexander of Jerusalem:
We have found, among the papers of Alexander, who was Bishop in Jerusalem, what he transcribed in his own hand from apostolic documents: on the eighth day before the calends of January Our Lord Jesus Christ was born, during the consulate of Sulpicius and Camerinus  
 Theophilus, bishop of Caesarea, as reported in Historia Ecclesiae Christi (or Centuriae Magdeburgenses, cent. II. chapter VI

Lastly, 25 December might be a reference to the date of the Feast of Dedication, which occurs on 25 Kislev of the Jewish calendar. This would require that early Christians simply translated Kislev directly to December.

Research done by members of the Church of Jesus Christ of Latter-day Saints generally places the birth of Jesus at some point in early to mid April. This research is motivated by a revelation from LDS founder Joseph Smith, which can be read to suggest that 6 April is the birth date of Jesus. September or late March have been suggested by theologian, biblical scholar and author Ian Paul.

Islamic view
In the hadith compilation Tuhaf al-Uqul, the sixth imam, Jafar As Sadiq says the following when approached about the birth of Christ during Christmas: "They have lied. Rather, it was in the middle of June. The day and night become even [equal] in the middle of March". This statement of his does not literally mean it was on 15 June but it is in reference to a day near the Spring Equinox.

See also

 Adoration of the shepherds
 Anno Domini
 Ante Christum Natum
 Baptism of Jesus
 Christ myth theory
 Chronology of Jesus
 Common Era
 Detailed Christian timeline
 Dionysius Exiguus
 Gospel harmony
 Historical Jesus
 Historicity of Jesus
 Jesus in Christianity
 Life of Jesus in the New Testament
 Timeline of the Bible
 Venerable Bede
 Talmud's claim that Jesus was born before 88 BCE

References

Notes

Citations

Sources

 
 
 
 
  Corrected reprinting of original 1999 edition.

 

 
 
 

 
 
 
 
 

 

 
 
 
 
 

  repr. in

Further reading

External links
 Catholic Encyclopedia (1910): Chronology of the Life of Jesus Christ

Chronology
Birth of Jesus
Historiography of Jesus
1st-century BC Christianity
Nativity of Jesus